A pioneer movement is an organization for children operated by a communist party. Typically children enter into the organization in elementary school and continue until adolescence. The adolescents then typically join the Young Communist League. Prior to the 1990s there was a wide cooperation between pioneer and similar movements of about 30 countries, coordinated by the international organization, International Committee of Children's and Adolescents' Movements (CIMEA), founded in 1958, with headquarters in Budapest, Hungary.

Overview

During the Russian Civil War from 1917 to 1921, most of the Russian Scoutmasters and many Scouts fought in the ranks of the White Army against the Red Army. Between 1918 and 1920, the All-Russian Congresses of the Russian Union of the Communist Youth (Komsomol) decided to eradicate the Scout movement and create an organization of the communist type, that would take Soviet children and adolescents under its umbrella. This organization would resemble the Scout movement in its form but properly educate children with Communist teachings.

On behalf of the Soviet Council of People's Commissars, Nadezhda Krupskaya (Vladimir Lenin's wife and the People's Commissar of State for Education) was one of the main contributors to the cause of the Pioneer movement. In 1922, she wrote an essay called "Russian Union of the Communist Youth and boy-Scoutism." However, it was the remaining scoutmasters themselves who supported the Komsomol and the Red Army, who introduced the name "Pioneer" to it and convinced the Komsomol to adapt the Scout symbols and rituals.

The first Pioneer organization was founded in Soviet Russia in 1922. Later, similar organizations were founded in the countries of the Eastern Bloc and other Communist states.

The Pioneer movement was modeled in many aspects on the Scout movement. The two movements share some principles like preparedness and promotion of sports and outdoor skills. The motto Always prepared! was adapted by the pioneer movement from the Scout Motto.

A member of the movement is known as a Pioneer, with the name stemming from the pioneering activity in Scouting. A neckerchief—typically red, but sometimes light blue—is the traditional item of clothing worn by a pioneer. This tradition was adapted from the Scout uniform.

But there are some distinct differences between the two movements. Most notably, the Scout movement is independent of government control and political parties. In contrast, the Pioneer movement is controlled by the Communist Party and includes teaching of communist principles. Opponents of Communism claim that this is a form of indoctrination.

Pioneer movements have existed and still exist in countries where the Communist Party is in power as well as in some countries where the Communist Party is in opposition, if the party is large enough to support a children's organization. In countries ruled by Communist Parties, membership of the pioneer movement is officially optional. However, membership provides many benefits, so the vast majority of children typically join the movement (although at different ages). During the existence of the Soviet Union, thousands of Young Pioneer camps and Young Pioneer Palaces were built exclusively for Young Pioneers, which were free of charge, sponsored by the government and trade unions. There were many newspapers and magazines published for Young Pioneers in millions of copies.

A national pioneer organization is often named after a famous party member that is considered a suitable role model for young communists, such as Vladimir Lenin in the Soviet Union, Enver Hoxha in Albania, Georgi Dimitrov in Bulgaria, José Martí in Cuba, Ernst Thälmann in East Germany, Damdin Sükhbaatar in Mongolia, and Ho Chi Minh in Vietnam.

Countries with current Pioneer movements 

The Pioneer movement now exists in these countries:
 Angola: Agostinho Neto Pioneer Organization
 Armenia: Republic of Young Pioneers and Lernamerdz Soviet Pioneers
 Belarus: Belarusian Republican Pioneer Organization
 Belgium: Pioneers of the Workers Party of Belgium
 People's Republic of China: Young Pioneers of China
 Cuba: José Martí Pioneer Organization established in 1961.
 Cyprus: United Democratic Youth Organisation
 Finland: Democratic Union of Finnish Pioneers (Pinskut)
 The Czech Republic: Pionýr is a non-political organisation organizing leisure time for children, part of the IFM-SEI.
 Laos: the Young Pioneers in Laos are under the Lao People's Revolutionary Youth Union (LPRYU).
 Mexico: Pioneers Association "Vicente Lombardo Toledano" of the Partido Popular Socialista
 North Korea: Young Pioneer Corps of the Korean Children's Union
 Portugal: Portuguese Communist Youth (founded in 1974), connected to the Portuguese Communist Party.
 Russia: Pioneers of the Communist Party of the Russian Federation
 Moldova: Pioneers of the Party of Communists of the Republic of Moldova
 Ukraine: Pioneers of the Communist Party of Ukraine
 Senegal: Mouvement Nationale des Pionniers Senegalese
 Spain: Pioneers of the Communist Party of the Basque Homelands
 Syria: Baath Party Pioneers
 Tajikistan: King Somoni Inheritance
 Vietnam: Ho Chi Minh Young Pioneer Organization, established on May 15, 1941

Older children could continue in other communist organizations, but that would typically be done only by a limited number of people.

The communist parties in Russia and other countries continue to run a pioneer organization, but membership tends to be quite limited.

Pioneer movements of the past

 Soviet Union: Vladimir Lenin All-Union Pioneer Organization, part of All-Union Leninist Young Communist League
 Socialist People's Republic of Albania: Pioneers of Enver
 People's Republic of Bulgaria: Dimitrovist Pioneer Organization "Septemberists". There were also an organization called chavdarcheta – these were the youngest children, which later became pioneers. The difference between the two was the distinctive scarf, which was sky-blue in the chavdarcheta movement and red in the pioneri movement.
 Socialist Republic of the Union of Burma: Sheihsaung Lu-nge (Pioneer Youth) part of Lansin Lu-nge Aphwe [Lansin Lu-nge Aphwe was an organisation for school students and university students to enter and learn about friendship, useful skills and the socialist politics of the Burma Socialist Programme Party. It comprises three branches: Teiza Lu-nge, Sheihsaung Lu-nge and Lansin Lu-nge. Teiza Lu-nge wore blue scarf and Shei-hsaung Lu-nge wore the Red scarf].
 People's Republic of Kampuchea: The Young Pioneers in Cambodia between 1979 and 1993 were under the Kampuchean Revolutionary Youth Association (KRYA) and the Kampuchean Young Pioneers Organization (KYPO), branches of the Kampuchean United Front for National Salvation.
 Czechoslovak Socialist Republic: Pioneer Organization of the Socialist Youth Union, part of the Socialist Youth Union.
 German Democratic Republic: Ernst Thälmann Pioneer Organisation
 Federal Republic of Germany: Junge Pioniere- Sozialistische Kinderorganisation
 People's Republic of Hungary: Úttörőszövetség
 Indonesia: Fadjar Harapan
 Malawi: Malawi Youth Pioneers – this is atypical as Malawi was not a communist country. Its Pioneers were linked to the Malawi Congress Party, the only political party allowed in what was at the time a one-party state.
 Mali: Young Pioneers/Jeunes Pionniers (1960–?), Socialist youth brigades established by the US-RDA of Modibo Keïta.
 Mongolian People's Republic: Sukhe Bator Mongolian Pioneers Organization
 Niger: Young Pioneers/Jeunes Pionniers (1961–1974) non-communist youth paramilitary group, one of several set up in post independence Africa, funded by and modeled on the Israeli Nahal ("Fighting Pioneer Youth").
 Burkina Faso: Pioneers of the Revolution, the youth movement of Thomas Sankara and the Council of Popular Salvation.
 Norway: Young Pioneers
 People's Republic of Poland: 1950–1956, later Związek Harcerstwa Polskiego, a mixture of Scouting and pioneering
 Socialist Republic of Romania: Pioneer Organization
 Socialist Federal Republic of Yugoslavia: Union of Pioneers of Yugoslavia (Pioniri), 1942–1992
United States:  Young Pioneers of America (1922–1934)

See also
Young Pioneer camp
International Falcon Movement - Socialist Education International
 Organizations for older youth:
Komsomol (Soviet Union)
Communist Youth League of China
 Kim Il-sung Socialist Youth League (North Korea)
Union of Communist Youth (Romania)
Związek Młodzieży Polskiej (Poland), after 1956 Związek Młodzieży Socjalistycznej, after 1976 Polish Socialist Youth Union
 Young Communist League (Cuba)

References

External links

 Pioneers (Belgium)
 Rules of Thälmann Pioneers (GDR)
 Young Pioneers (People's Republic of China)
 Ho Chi Minh Communist Youth Union (Vietnam) 
 Reproduction of a US Young Pioneer leaflet form the Library of Congress
 7 common character types from movies about pioneers. Source: Russia Beyond the Headlines

 
Youth movements
Youth wings of communist parties